Kanoa Lloyd (born December 1986) is a television and radio presenter from New Zealand. Lloyd was born in Gisborne to Ngāti Porou whānau, and grew up in Dunedin.

Biography 
In 2009 Lloyd joined the presenting team on after school show Sticky TV. From 2014 Lloyd was a weather presenter for 3 News at 6pm, where she notably introduced some te reo Māori. In February 2017 Lloyd became one of the three inaugural presenters of 7pm current affairs/entertainment show The Project. Lloyd also read the news on radio's Mai FM, from 2012 to 2014.

References

New Zealand comedians
Living people
People from Gisborne, New Zealand
1986 births
Ngāti Porou people
New Zealand radio presenters
New Zealand television presenters
New Zealand women comedians
New Zealand women television presenters
New Zealand women radio presenters